The London Regional Select Committee was one of nine regional select committee of the House of Commons in the Parliament of the United Kingdom. The establishment of the committee was agreed by the House of Commons on 25 June 2009, following the establishment of regional select committees for the eight other regions of England in November 2008, and the appointment of 'regional ministers' by Gordon Brown on his appointment as Prime Minister in June 2007. The committee came into existence on 1 January 2009 and ceased to exist upon the dissolution of Parliament on 12 April 2010.

The purpose of the committee, which was slightly different from the remit of the other regional select committees, was "to examine the Government’s regional policies for London and the Government’s relationship with the Greater London Authority and regional bodies".

Membership
The committee was first appointed by the House of Commons on 14 December 2009, nine months after the appointment of the eight other regional affairs select committees. The committee only contained 5 Labour members and one Independent member as opposed to the 9 members from various parties as was agreed in the original regional committee establishment motion of 12 November 2008, as the Conservatives and Liberal Democrats refused to nominate any members as a sign of their opposition to the existence of regional committees.

Source: Hansard - 14 December 2009

References

Regional Select Committees of the British House of Commons